Ingerophrynus kumquat is a species of toad in the family Bufonidae. It is endemic to the Selangor state, Peninsular Malaysia, where it is only known from peat swamps near its type locality. This species is a peat swamp specialist that is locally abundant but is threatened by habitat loss caused by drainage and reclamation of peat swamps for agriculture.

References

External links
 Amphibian and Reptiles of Peninsular Malaysia - Ingerophrynus kumquat

kumquat
Amphibians of Malaysia
Endemic fauna of Malaysia
Amphibians described in 2000
Taxonomy articles created by Polbot